Smallville follows the life of Clark Kent (Tom Welling), beginning when he is a teenager in the town of Smallville, Kansas, and continuing through high school, college, and his start at the Daily Planet before he adopts the "Superman" persona. As the series progresses, Clark Kent copes with his emerging superpowers (x-ray vision, super hearing, etc.), exploration of his extraterrestrial origins and discovering his true destiny. The series also deals with the people in Clark Kent's life: his human parents, Jonathan Kent (John Schneider) and Martha Kent (Annette O'Toole); his friends Chloe Sullivan (Allison Mack) and Pete Ross (Sam Jones III); his love interest for seven seasons Lana Lang (Kristin Kreuk); Chloe's cousin and Clark's love interest since season eight, Lois Lane (Erica Durance); and his friendship with Lex Luthor (Michael Rosenbaum) and how this gradually decays into their mutual enmity of legend.

Series overview

Episodes

Season 1 (2001–02)

Season 2 (2002–03)

Season 3 (2003–04)

Season 4 (2004–05)

Season 5 (2005–06)

Season 6 (2006–07)

Season 7 (2007–08)

Season 8 (2008–09)

Season 9 (2009–10)

Season 10 (2010–11)

Nielsen rankings

Home media
All ten seasons have been released on DVD in Regions 1, 2 and 4. Seasons five and six were also released in the now obsolete HD DVD format on November 28, 2006, and September 18, 2007, respectively. Seasons six, seven, eight, nine and ten have also been released on Blu-ray formats. The DVD releases include commentary by cast and crew members on selected episodes, deleted scenes, and behind-the-scenes featurettes. The promotional tie-ins, Chloe Chronicles and Vengeance Chronicles, accompanied the season two, three, and five box sets respectively. Other special features include interactive functionality such as a tour of Smallville, a comic book, and DVD-ROM material. The complete series box set includes additional special features never before released.

Notes

References

External links 
 
 
 List of Smallville episodes at kryptonsite.com
 

Lists of American fantasy television series episodes
Lists of American science fiction television series episodes
Lists of American teen drama television series episodes
Lists of DC Comics television series episodes